The FIS Alpine World Ski Championships 1958 were held 1–9 February in Bad Gastein, Salzburg, Austria.

Austrian Toni Sailer, 22, won three gold medals and a silver. The triple gold medalist from the 1956 Winter Olympics successfully defended three of his four world titles. Lucile Wheeler of Canada, 23, won two gold medals and a silver.

Men's competitions

Downhill
Sunday, 9 February

In soft snow conditions, Sailer won his final competitive race and wrapped up the combined title as well.American Buddy Werner fell but finished 37th at 2:48.7, which ended his chances for a combined medal.

Giant Slalom
Wednesday, 5 February

 After being edged out in the slalom, Sailer won the giant slalom by nearly four seconds.

Slalom
Sunday, 2 February

In the opening race of the championships, Igaya of Japan, the 1956 Olympic silver medalist,led after the first run in an attempt to become the first champion from Asia, but finished with bronze. 
Rieder foiled another gold medal sweep by compatriot Sailer, who won silver.

Combined

At the World Championships from 1954 through 1980, the combined was a "paper race" using the results of the three events (DH, GS, SL).

Women's competitions

Downhill
Thursday, 6 February

Giant Slalom
Saturday, 8 February

Slalom
Monday, 3 February

 Defending and Olympic champion Renée Colliard of Switzerland fell during the second run.

Combined

At the World Championships from 1954 through 1980, the combined was a "paper race" using the results of the three events (DH, GS, SL).

Medals table

Video
Gasteinertal.com – 1958 World Championships –

References

External links
FIS-ski.com – results – 1958 World Championships – Bad Gastein, Austria
FIS-ski.com – official results for the FIS Alpine World Ski Championships

1958 in alpine skiing
1958 in Austrian sport
1958
A
Ankogel Group
Goldberg Group
Alpine skiing competitions in Austria
February 1958 sports events in Europe